The Communist Party of Australia (CPA), known as the Australian Communist Party (ACP) from 1944 to 1951, was an Australian political party founded in 1920. The party existed until roughly 1991, with its membership and influence having been in a steady decline since its peak in 1945. Like most communist parties in the west, the party was heavily involved in the labour movement and the trade unions. Its membership, popularity and influence grew significantly during most of the interwar period before reaching its climax in 1945, where the party achieved a membership of slightly above 22,000 members. Although the party did not achieve a federal MP, Fred Paterson was elected to the Parliament of Queensland (for Bowen) at the 1944 state election. He won re-election in 1947 before the seat was abolished. The party also held office in over a dozen local government areas across New South Wales and Queensland.

After nineteen years of activity, the CPA was formally banned on 15 June 1940 under the relatively new Menzies government (1939–1941). The party was banned under the National Security (Subversive Associations) Regulations 1940. Two-and-a-half years later, the party was again a lawful organisation. When the party contested the federal election eight months later, it received its biggest vote total. Getting a total of 81,816 votes (1.93–2.00%), the party received over 20,000 in Victoria and Queensland, and over 19,000 in New South Wales. It was the party's biggest vote total since the 1934 federal election. However, by the late 1960s the party fell into single digit numbers before a brief spike in the mid 1970s. By the mid to late 1980s the party was effectively stagnant and the party was soon dissolved.

History

Foundation and early years
 
The Communist Party of Australia was founded in Sydney on 30 October 1920 by a group of socialists inspired by reports of the Russian Revolution. Groups included the Australian Socialist Party, some members from the Victorian Socialist Party (although the party itself did not join), as well as a variety of militant trade unionists. Among the party's founders were a prominent Sydney trade unionist, Jock Garden, Tom Walsh, William Paisley Earsman. Women suffragettes and anti-conscriptionists included Adela Pankhurst (daughter of the British suffragist Emmeline Pankhurst), Christian Jollie Smith and Katharine Susannah Prichard.

Most of the then illegal Australian section of the Industrial Workers of the World (IWW) joined, but the IWW soon left the Communist Party, with its original members, over disagreements with the direction of the Soviet Union and Bolshevism.  In its early years, mainly through Garden's efforts, the party achieved some influence in the trade union movement in New South Wales, but by the mid-1920s it had dwindled to an insignificant group.

A visits to the 1924 New Zealand conference by CPA executive members Hetty and Hector Ross got the (also small) Communist Party of New Zealand agreeing to temporary affiliation with the CPA, and were followed by visits in 1925 by Harry Quaife, and by Norman Jeffery a bow-tie wearing former "Wobbly" (IWW member).

Garden and other communists were expelled from the Labor Party in 1924. The CPA ran candidates including Garden at the 1925 New South Wales state election in working-class seats against the ALP, but was decisively defeated. This prompted Garden to leave the party in 1926 and return to the Labor Party. The leadership of the party went to Jack Kavanagh, an experienced Canadian communist activist who had moved to Australia in 1925, and Esmonde Higgins, a talented Melbourne journalist who was the nephew of a High Court judge, H.B. Higgins.

But in 1929 the party leadership fell into disfavour with Communist International, which under orders from Joseph Stalin had taken a turn to radical revolutionary rhetoric (the so-called "Third Period"), and an emissary, the American Communist Harry M. Wicks, was sent to correct the party's perceived errors. Kavanagh was expelled in 1930 and Higgins resigned. A new party leadership, consisting of J.B. (Jack) Miles, Lance Sharkey and Richard Dixon, was imposed on the party by the Communist International, and remained in control for the next 30 years. During the 1930s the party experienced some growth, particularly after 1935 when Communist International changed its policy in favour of a "united front against fascism."  The Movement Against War and Fascism was founded to bring together all opponents of fascism under a communist controlled umbrella organisation. The movement instigated the events which led to the attempted exclusion of Egon Kisch from Australia in late 1934 and early 1935.

The CPA was the first Australian political party to make a commitment to Aboriginal rights, which were included in its manifesto from 1931 onwards.

Rise during World War II
The Communist Party began to win positions in trade unions such as the Miners' Federation and the Waterside Workers' Federation of Australia, although its parliamentary candidates nearly always polled poorly at elections. The party also set up an organization of the unemployed to resist evictions. Activists from the party joined the International Brigades to defend the Second Republic against Franco's troops. Throughout this time, members of the CPA were under constant surveillance by police and intelligence forces and harassed by the courts.

In 1939, after Soviet efforts to contain Nazi aggression through co-operation and alliance with France and Britain were rejected by the French and British, Nazi Germany and the Soviet Union signed a Non-Aggression Treaty. Despite ideological opposition between the countries, the USSR agreed not to engage in hostilities against Germany at the outbreak of World War II (Australia declared war on Nazi Germany for invading Poland). Consequently, the Communist Party of Australia opposed and sought to disrupt Australia's war effort against Germany in the early stages of the War under orders of the Communist International on the grounds that it was a war between Imperialist nations, and not in the interests of the working class. Menzies banned the CPA after the fall of France in 1940, but by 1941 Stalin was forced to join the allied cause when Hitler reneged on the Pact and invaded the USSR. The USSR came to bear the brunt of the carnage of Hitler's war machine and the Communist Party in Australia lost its early war stigma as a result.<ref>{{Cite book|last=Beaumont|first=Joan|url=https://books.google.com/books?id=jNXsy27cLSIC&q=communist+party+of+australia+opposed+australian+war+effort&pg=PA94|title=Australia's war 1939-1945|pages=94–95|publisher=Allen & Unwin|year=1996|isbn=9781864480399}}</ref> Its membership rose to 20,000, it won control of a number of important trade unions, and a Communist candidate, Fred Paterson, was elected to the Queensland parliament. The Communist Party achieved a majority of seats in the New South Wales' Kearsley Shire from 1944 to 1947. The Shire was committed to municipal socialism, advocating nationalisation of electricity and the expansion of the social wage, and was unique for its commitment to activism around federal and international affairs. But the party remained marginal to the Australian political mainstream. The Australian Labor Party remained the dominant party of the Australian left.

Postwar
After 1945 and the onset of the Cold War, the party entered a steady decline. Following the new line from Moscow, and believing that a new "imperialist war" and a new depression were imminent, and that the CPA should immediately contest for leadership of the working class with the Australian Labor Party, the CPA launched an industrial offensive in 1947, culminating in a prolonged strike in the coal mines in 1949. The Chifley Labor government saw this as a Communist challenge to its position in the labour movement, and used the army and strikebreakers to break the strike. The Communist Party never again held such a strong position in the union movement.

In 1949, the USSR detonated its first atomic bomb and Mao Zedong gained control in China. A year later, North Korea invaded South Korea and in 1951, during the Korean War, the Liberal government of Robert Menzies tried to ban the Communist Party of Australia, first by legislation that was declared invalid by the High Court, then by referendum to try to overcome the constitutional obstacles to that legislation. The 1951 referendum was opposed by the Communist Party as well as the Australian Labor Party, and was narrowly defeated. The issue of Communist influence in the unions remained potent and led to the Australian Labor Party split of 1955 and the formation of the Democratic Labor Party comprising disaffected ALP members who were concerned over Communist influence in Australian unions.

Internal division and defections
In 1956, three years after Stalin died, Soviet leader Nikita Khrushchev revealed Stalin's crimes in the Secret Speech—exposing in gruesome detail the mechanism of terror and system of arbitrary rule, usually against entirely innocent victims, that terrorised Russia for three decades. The Australian party leadership—entirely committed to Stalinism—was confused about what to do. It tried to suppress discussions of the speech, which was widely reported in the press. According to Ralph Gibson, several high-ranking members including Ted Hill had received a copy of Krushchev's secret speech directly from the Communist Party of the Soviet Union However, the party denied the criticisms of Stalin within the party newspaper, Tribune.

Disillusioned members began to leave the party. More left after the Soviet invasion of Hungary in 1956. In 1961, the leader of the "pro-China" faction of the party during the Sino-Soviet split, Ted Hill, was expelled from the party. Hill proceeded to lead a split of pro-China members of the party, which culminated in the formation of the smaller Communist Party of Australia (Marxist-Leninist).

By the 1960s, the party's membership had fallen to around 5,000 members, but it continued to hold positions in a number of trade unions, and it was also influential in the various protest movements of the period, especially the movement against the Vietnam War. This period also saw the establishment of the National Training Centre in Minto, NSW, ostensibly for the purpose of educating in the ideology of Marxism-Leninism. The party became more openly critical about the Soviet Union and the Communist Party of the Soviet Union. In 1966, the party started their own magazine called Australian Left Review. In 1967, the party ceased receiving payments from the Communist Party of the Soviet Union following a seminar by Laurie Aarons in the Soviet Union which argued that "ideas require free contest, not confined in a framework of established dogmas that can become a rigid or even ossified edifice". But the Soviet invasion of Czechoslovakia in 1968 triggered another crisis. Sharkey's successor as party leader, Laurie Aarons, denounced the invasion, and a group of pro-Soviet hardliners left in 1971 to form a new party, the Socialist Party of Australia.

Through the 1970s and 1980s the party continued to decline, despite adopting Eurocommunism and democratising its internal structures so that it became a looser radical party rather than a classic Marxist-Leninist one. The CPA conducted campaigns against nuclear weapons and the extraction of uranium, and supported the demands of indigenous peoples in Australia and abroad, especially in Papua New Guinea. It thus militated for the abolition of legislation judged repressive regarding indigenous people, for equal pay and for land rights. Its members helped Aboriginal workers in Pilbara lead the longest industrial strike ever in Australia. Internationally, the Communist Party of Australia was close to the Revolutionary Front for the Independence of East Timor (Fretilin) who resisted the Indonesian occupation in the 1970s and 1980s. By 1990, membership had declined to below the one thousand mark.

Dissolution
In 1991, the Communist Party was dissolved and the New Left Party formed. The New Left Party was intended to be a broader party which would attract a wider range of members, which did not happen, and the New Left Party disbanded in 1992. The assets of the Communist Party were thereafter directed into the SEARCH Foundation (acronym for "Social Education, Action and Research Concerning Humanity"), a not-for-profit company set up in 1990 "to preserve and draw on the resources of the Communist Party of Australia and its archives." The archives of the party are now held at the State Library of NSW and can be accessed with the written permission of the SEARCH Foundation. The State Library of New South Wales holds an extensive collection of material related to the Communist Party of Australia including oral history recordings, business papers, the personal papers of a range of men and women involved in the Party and a collection of images that were published in Tribune, the Party's newspaper. The Victoria University Library holds the Crow Collection, donated by long-time Communist Party member Ruth Crow, which includes materials from her years campaigning for the Communist Party. The University of Melbourne collection is "one of the most significant from the CPA held in Australia", containing 20th-century materials from the Victorian branch.

Search Foundation

The SEARCH Foundation is a left-wing Australian not-for-profit company that was established in 1990 as a successor organisation of the Communist Party of Australia to preserve and draw on its resources and archives. It inherited over 3 million dollars from the CPA.

SEARCH is an active membership-based organisation that runs speaking tours, publications and training programs. Members are welcome from across the Australian Left and include prominent political figures such as Australian Council of Trade Unions Secretary Sally McManus, and former NSW Greens Senator Lee Rhiannon. SEARCH maintains an office at Sydney Trades Hall and holds events across Australia. Its archives are held by the State Library of NSW.

SEARCH is an acronym for "Social Education, Action and Research Concerning Humanity".

Youth movement
 

Its youth wing worked under several different names at different times, including the Young Communist League (YCL); the Young Comrades Club (YCC); the League of Young Democrats (LYD); the Eureka Youth League (EYL); and lastly the Young Socialist League, which in 1984 became part of the Left Alliance.

The youth wing of CPA worked under several different names in different periods from the 1920s onwards, including the Young Communist League (YCL), which was created in 1923 and published its own newspaper, The Young Worker, and the Young Comrades Club (YCC), founded in 1927. At a meeting in Melbourne in 1937 attended by 1,500 people, the YCL changed its name to the League of Young Democrats (LYD). After the LYD was banned by the Menzies government in 1941, the Eureka Youth League (EYL) was established in December of that year, whose membership grew to 1,000 with a year. The EYL published a newspaper called Youth Voice, and undertook activities relating to World War II and the working and living conditions of young people, as well as the peace movement during this war and the Korean War later. In 1952 it held the "Youth Carnival for Peace and Friendship" in Sydney, attracting 30,000 attendees. EYL opposed the introduction of National Service in Australia in the 1950s.

The Eureka Youth League also had an important role in the early promotion of jazz music in Australia in the 1940s under the leadership of Harry Stein.

EYL collaborated with the Australian Council of Trade Unions (ACTU) and helped to arrange its Youth Weeks, and also ran youth camps across Australia, attended by thousands of young people. It protested the Vietnam War actively, but by 1968 membership had declined, and a change of name to the Young Socialist League did not last long.

Camp Eureka, created in 1973, is still maintained as an historic and usable camp for up to 32 people.

The Eureka Youth League was a founding member of the World Federation of Democratic Youth, a membership later taken over by the Young Communist Movement. In 1984 (or 1987?) the Young Socialist League became part of Left Alliance.

Elected representatives
New South Wales
Broken Hill
 Bill Flynn, Alderman of the City of Broken Hill (1953–1974).
 Bill Whiley, Alderman of the City of Broken Hill (1962–1974).

Bulli
 Andrew Speed, Councillor of Bulli Shire for B Riding (1944–1947).

Cessnock
 Charles Evans, Alderman of the Municipality of Cessnock (1944–1947).
 Herbert Wilkinson, Alderman of the Municipality of Cessnock (1944–1947).
 Thomas Gilmour, Alderman of the Municipality of Cessnock (1944–1947, 1953–1962).

Coonabarabran
 Walter Frater, Councillor of Coonabarabran Shire (1953–1956).

Kearsley
 Jock Graham, Councillor of the Kearsley Shire (1944–1947).
 Allan Opie, Deputy Shire President and Councillor of Kearsley Shire (1944–1947).
 James Palmer, Councillor of Kearsley Shire (1944–1947).
 Nellie Simm, Councillor of Kearsley Shire (1944–1947).
 William Varty, Shire President and Councillor of Kearsley Shire (1944–1947).

Lake Macquarie
 William Quinn, Councillor of Lake Macquarie Shire for B Riding (1944–1947, 1953–1959).
 R. Chapman, Councillor of Lake Macquarie Shire for B Riding (1944–1947), Deputy Shire President (1945–1946) and Shire President (1946–1947).
 J. Thomson, Councillor of Lake Macquarie Shire for B Riding (1944–1947).

Lithgow
 Jock King, Alderman of the Lithgow City Council (1952–1956)

North Illawarra
 Jack Martin, Alderman of the Municipality of North Illawarra (1944–1947).

Penrith
 Mel McCalman, Alderman of the Municipality of Penrith for St. Mary's Ward (1953–1962).

Randwick
 Richard Ernest Wilson, Alderman of the Municipality of Randwick (1944–1948) and Deputy Mayor (1947–1948).

Redfern
 Patrick Levelle, Alderman of the Municipality of Redfern for Redfern Ward (1947–1948).

City of Sydney
 Ronald Maxwell, Alderman of the City of Sydney for City Ward (1953–1956).
 Thomas Wright, Alderman of the City of Sydney for City Ward (1953–1959).
 Jack Mundey, Alderman of the City of Sydney (1984–1987).

Queensland
 Jim Henderson, Councillor of the Shire of Wangaratta for Collinsville (1939–1944).
 Fred Paterson, Alderman of the Townsville City Council (1939–1944) and Member of the Legislative Assembly for Bowen (1944–1950) (the only member elected at state or federal level).

Election results
Federal

 
Average number of votes p/candidate (both houses)

New South Wales

Queensland

South Australia

Tasmania

Victoria

Western Australia

See also
 Socialism in Australia
 Communist party

References
Notes:

Footnotes:

Further reading

 Stuart Macintyre, The Reds, 1998, Allen and Unwin. 1st volume of a major history covering foundation to 1941.
 Alastair Davidson, The Communist Party of Australia: A short history, 1969. Covers foundation to the late 1960s.

 Tom O'Lincoln, Into the Mainstream: The Decline of Australian Communism, January, 1985. .
 Daisy Marchisotti, Land Rights: The Black Struggle'', Brisbane: Queensland State Committee, Communist Party of Australia, 1978. 

1920 establishments in Australia
1991 disestablishments in Australia
Australia–Soviet Union relations
Australian labour movement
Australia
Communist parties in Australia
Defunct communist parties
Defunct political parties in Australia
Far-left politics in Australia
Formerly banned communist parties
Industrial Workers of the World in Australia
Marxist parties in Australia
Political parties disestablished in 1991
Political parties established in 1920